The Monument to Koroghlu commemorates the central character of the Epic of Koroghlu. It is located in Baku, Azerbaijan at the intersection of Azadlig and Vagif avenues, in a park bearing the hero's name. The monument was raised on the site of the monument to Prokofy Dzhaparidze, which was dismantled in 2009.

The author of the monument is Tokay Mammadov, the Peoples Artist of Azerbaijan. The order to raise a monument to Koroghlu in Baku was issued in 2009. The monuments unveiling took place on 21 February 2012. The opening ceremony was attended by the President of the Republic of Azerbaijan, Ilham Aliyev.

See also 
 Aliagha Vahid Monument
 Mustafa Kemal Atatürk Monument, Baku
 Wolfgang Amadeus Mozart monument, Baku

References

Monuments and memorials in Baku